Defne is a new intracity district and second-level municipality in Hatay Province, Turkey. According to Law act no 6360, all Turkish provinces with a population more than 750,000 were declared metropolitan municipality. The law also created new districts within the capital city which have second-level municipalities in addition the metropolitan municipality.  Defne is one of them.

Thus after 2014 the present Hatay central district was split into two. A part was named Defne and the name Hatay was reserved for the metropolitan municipality. (Defne means laurus which is one of the agricultural products of Hatay Province; it is also related to the ancient suburb of Antioch, Daphne.)

Rural area

There were 9 towns and 24 villages in the rural area of Defne district. Their official status has since become "neighborhood of Defne".

See also
Defne Magnanery, a vocational training center for silk farming.

References

Districts of Hatay Province